Antoine Aureche aka Valfeu (born 4 December 1981) is a French musician, guitarist, singer, composer, electro producer and video maker. He is mainly known for his duet with Desireless, French pop star of the 80s ("Voyage, Voyage"). His work is a bridge between a diverse group of genres: from classical music to electro, pop, progressive, symphonic, dark & experimental music.

Biography 

Aureche studied music at the Conservatory in Annecy.

Influenced by bands such as King Crimson, Gentle Giant, and Robert Wyatt, Aureche created his first band, Thork, and produced a first album at the end of the 90's (Urdoxa, 2000).

In 2006, Antoine Aureche created his acoustic project TAT, which allowed him to sign with the Swiss label Urgence Disk Records and to produce three albums (Quinta Essentia, 2006, Le Sperme De Tous Les Métaux, 2007, and Testament, 2010). The purpose of TAT is experimental: to make a musical alchemy. Through this project, TAT collaborated with several underground artists such as Le Chiffre, Vx69 of Punish Yourself, Laurie Lipton & Laurent Courau from the Adobe Of Chaos.

In 2008, Antoine created Operation Of The Sun, which allowed him to play a music which he had never played up to now: dancefloor electro music. Antoine produced a retrofuturistic debut album, Solar Squirrels Exodus, in 2009, and Désir Parabolique in 2011. This project led him to collaborate with new artists, such as Greta Gratos & The Eternal Afflict.

In 2011, Antoine also met Desireless, and decided to create a new duet with her called Desireless & Operation of the Sun. This project, like a bridge between pop and underground music, was supported by many collaborators such as Solar Fake, The Eternal Afflict, Oil 10, BAK XIII, Psyche. Since then, Antoine plays guitars and sings in concert with Desireless all over Europe (shows in Russia, Germany, Slovakia, Belarus, Belgium, Switzerland & France), from festivals (Wave Gotik Treffen, Montereau Confluences, W-Festival) to 80's shows (the duet has shared the top line of posters with Peter Hook of Joy Division, Front 242, Anne Clark, Human League, Thomas Anders of Modern Talking, Lio, Sabrina, Samantha Fox, Sandra).

In 2016, the duo Desireless & Operation of the Sun created a musical theatre show, including a puppet, in tribute to the French poet Guillaume Apollinaire, for the Apollinaire Museum in Belgium. The project was titled "Guillaume" at the beginning (2015), then it becomes an album now available on all music plateforms (2017), titled "Desireless chante Apollinaire featuring Valfeu".

In 2018, Antoine started using a new pseudonym: Valfeu. As Valfeu, he released an electronic symphony, Faust, based on Goethe's tragedy. He worked on it with Sue Denim of Robots In Disguise, Desireless, Cheerleader 69, Titend & Music for the space.

In February 2019, TAT evolutes and becomes Tat Resurrectio. With Tat Resurrectio, Antoine plays a new neo-folk show (featuring Le Chiffre, Nevah & Diabolus in Viola) as supporting act for Brendan Perry of Dead Can Dance. The city of Lyon (France) recognizes him as an official artist of the program "40 ans de Musiques Actuelles à Lyon".

Aureche teaches at the Academy of Music and Dance in Miribel, Ain.

Discography (with Thork) 
Urdoxa (2000) (as composer, singer and guitarist)
Weila (2004) (as composer only)

Discography (as TAT) 
Quinta Essentia (LP/CD, 2006) (as composer, singer, guitarist and electro producer)
Le Sperme De Tous Les Métaux (LP/CD, 2007) (as composer, singer, guitarist and electro producer)
Testament (LP/digital, 2010) (as composer, singer, guitarist and electro producer)

Discography (as Operation of the Sun) 
Solar Squirrels Exodus (LP/CD, 2009) (as composer, singer, guitarist and electro producer)
Désir Parabolique (LP/CD, 2011) (as composer, singer, guitarist and electro producer)

Discography (with Desireless) 
L'Oeuf Du Dragon (EP/digital, 2012) (as composer, singer, guitarist and electro producer)
Remixes Draconiques (EP/digital remixes, 2012) (as composer, singer, guitarist and electro producer)
L'Oeuf Du Dragon (EP/CD, 2013) (as composer, singer, guitarist and electro producer)
Noun (LP/CD, 2014) (as composer, singer, guitarist and electro producer)
Nexus (LP/digital remixes, 2014) (as composer, singer, guitarist and electro producer)
Un Seul Peuple (LP/CD, 2014) (as composer, singer, guitarist and electro producer)
2011-2015 (LP/digital best of, 2015) (as composer, singer, guitarist and electro producer)
Guillaume (LP/CD, 2015) (as composer, singer, guitarist and electro producer)
Desireless chante Apollinaire (LP/digital, 2017) (as composer, singer, guitarist and electro producer)

Discography (as Valfeu) 
Faust (LP/digital, 2018) (as composer, singer, guitarist and electro producer)

References

External links

Tat Resurrectio & Brendan Perry in Lyon
Antoine Aureche – Biography
Desireless

Collaborators

French rock guitarists
French male guitarists
Living people
1981 births
People from Annecy
21st-century French singers
21st-century guitarists
21st-century French male singers